"We'll Burn That Bridge" is a song written by Don Cook and Ronnie Dunn and recorded by American country music duo Brooks & Dunn. Released in May 1993 as the second single from their album, Hard Workin' Man, it peaked at #2 on the country charts for two weeks, behind "Chattahoochee" by Alan Jackson.

Content
The song's narrator meets a woman whose man had walked out on her. The narrator promises her that he'll take her so much higher from where the man left her down at, and tells her that if her former lover's memory comes around, that they'll burn that bridge when they get there.

Chart positions
"We'll Burn That Bridge" debuted at number 70 on the U.S. Billboard Hot Country Singles & Tracks for the week of May 15, 1993.

Year-end charts

References

1993 singles
Brooks & Dunn songs
Songs written by Ronnie Dunn
Songs written by Don Cook
Song recordings produced by Don Cook
Song recordings produced by Scott Hendricks
Arista Nashville singles
1993 songs